is a Japanese racing cyclist, who currently rides for and manages Japanese amateur team Sparkle Ōita Racing Team.

Career
He won the first stage of the Tour de Hokkaido in 2012 while still a student at the National Institute of Fitness and Sports in Kanoya. He joined  starting with the 2014 season, and stayed on with the team as it became a Pro Continental team starting in the 2015 season.

Major results
2012
1st Stage 1 Tour de Hokkaido
2018
1st Stage 3 Tour de Lombok

References

External links

1992 births
Living people
Japanese male cyclists
People from Ōita (city)